Mandragora are an English space rock/world dance music band from Brighton, England, whose formative output can be described as psychedelic rock with ethnic sounds and tribal rhythms.  Formed in 1983, the band have released 5 albums of their own, and a collaborative album with Phil Thornton. They built up a loyal following on the free festival circuit of the 1980s and 1990s, and were signed to Delerium Records. In recent years Mandragora have evolved into a world music/electronic dance act featuring singers and musicians from all corners of the globe.

History

Early years
Mandragora began life as a Hawkwind influenced psychedelic rock band formed by Simon Williams in 1983. They played gigs and festivals around the UK including the Stonehenge Free Festival of 1984. Their first album was a self-financed cassette only release called Something Missing. In 1983 Simon Williams saw a performance by innovative New Age synthesizer pioneer, Phil Thornton at a festival in Sussex and after the show the two met. So in 1988 when Mandragora were asked to open for Hawkwind on their UK tour, Phil Thornton was invited to play synths with the band. With improvisation a key component of Mandragora's live concerts, Phil, with his Moog synthesizer and samplers, gave them a much more sophisticated sound.

While the band's early material, due to its guitar and synth driven nature, was always compared favourably to other similar acts such as Ozric Tentacles, the band always experimented with different musical styles. It is this interest and experimentation that led to the band's style and integration of many different musical genres, with Simon Williams stating that the impact Phil Thornton's studio experience and production skills had on the second album, 1991's Head First (Resonance Records), was immense, the band started to receive airplay on BBC radio with John Peel and Mark Radcliffe playing their track "Zarg".
Two studio albums (Head First and Earthdance), a live album (Temple Ball) and a collaboration with Phil Thornton on his solo album While The Green Man Sleeps followed to critical acclaim.

Mandragora have toured extensively throughout their career and played in many European countries, including Israel, Germany, Russia, Italy, Denmark, France, Éire, Hungary, Belgium, the Netherlands, Czech Republic, Switzerland, Hungary and the UK. To this end, Mandragora started to gain a large following around the UK free festival scene, including three appearances at the Glastonbury Festival. They were also invited to open for many varied artists such as The Wailers, Gil Scott-Heron, Transglobal Underground, Gong, The Orb and The Shamen. Niall Hone has since gone on to join Hawkwind and Nik Hunt has joined Here & Now.

Later years

The release of the band's most recent album, Pollen, in 1998 saw them shift into a more dance orientated direction, encompassing elements of dub, psy-trance and Celtic music. They drew on both traditional world musical styles and the mechanisms of the psychedelic dance scene.
Also on this album were notable guest appearances from Howard Marks and Arthur Brown.
After the release of Pollen the band took a hiatus. Multi-instrumentalists Simon Williams and Phil Thornton went on to form Earthdance a group of musicians, film makers and producers specialising in world/dance and chillout music.

Resurgence
According to the band's official website a new album is scheduled for release in 2010. The article states: "World dance music pioneers and firm festival favorites’ Mandragora’ are back doing live shows and have a new album/film scheduled for release in 2010. The current line-up features the amazing Bosnian singer  Dalinda, who grew up in Libya and  has released albums for ARC records. Dalinda is well known all over the Middle East and North Africa from her MTV appearances in Egypt and live performances throughout the world.
Original members Simon Williams and Phil Thornton are back performing live again as Mandragora after several years concentrating on studio projects, producing other artists and performing live with other acts as well as recording musicians all over the globe!"

Band members
 Simon Williams - guitar, synths, vocals
 Phil Thornton - keyboards, samples, e-bow, guitar
 Dalinda - vocals
 Simon Cowburn - percussion	
 Al Jenkins - bass
 Steve Elliott - bass
 Angus Ross - keyboards, vocals
 Andy Stokes - drums, percussion
 David C. Hëwitt - keyboards
 Niall Hone - bass, feedback, samples
 Pete Newman - drums, percussion
 Mick Reed - drums
 Geoff Holroyde - drums, percussion
 Nikelby Hunt - drums
 Nick Colegrave - synthesizer
 Tim Burton - Vocals and synth
 Guy Pearson - Drums
 Stuart Ranger - Bass
Steve Cassidy - Drums

Discography

Albums
 1988 Over the Moon - LP/CD (Babbleon Records) (CD re-released on Delerium Records has three extra tracks)
 1991 Head First - LP/CD (Resonance Records) (CD re-released on Delerium Records has three extra tracks)
 1993 Earthdance - LP/CD (Mystic Stones)
 1994 Temple Ball - LP/CD (Mystic Stones)
 1998 Pollen - CD (Delerium Records)

With Phil Thornton
 1993 While the Green Man Sleeps - LP/CD (Mystic Stones)

Cassette only albums
 1984 Somethink Missing
 1990 Under the Sun Live
 1992 Mandrake Madness (outtakes and Live)

Also, the track Conspiracy appears on the Delerium compilation A Psychedelic Psauna (In Four Parts).

References

External links
 Mandragora at MySpace
 Interview with Simon Williams and Simon Cowburn from 1999
 Mandragora on the official Phil Thornton website
 Mandragora's Delerium Records page
 Earthdance at MySpace
 Mandragora on psychedelicmusic.net
 Mandragora at Discogs
 Earthdance website

Jam bands
English psychedelic rock music groups
English space rock musical groups